Austin Johnson (born June 16, 1989) is a former American football fullback. He played college football at Tennessee and attended Hickory High School in Hickory, North Carolina.

Early years
Johnson played football and baseball at Hickory High School in Hickory, North Carolina. He was an all-state selection for football in 2006 and 2007. He recorded 692 rushing yards and 18 rushing touchdowns on 108 attempts his senior year. Johnson also recorded 35 receptions and 470 receiving yards. He finished his high school career with 580 tackles.

College career
Johnson played for the Tennessee Volunteers from 2008 to 2011. He was an Academic All-SEC selection in 2008, 2009, and 2010.

Professional career

Baltimore Ravens
Johnson was signed by the Baltimore Ravens of the NFL on April 29, 2012 after going undrafted in the 2012 NFL Draft.

New Orleans Saints
Johnson signed with the NFL's New Orleans Saints on January 7, 2013. He was released by the Saints on August 31, 2013. He was signed to the Saints' practice squad on September 4, 2013. He made his NFL debut on September 7, 2014 against the Atlanta Falcons. Johnson suffered a knee injury in the Saints' Week 8 game against the Green Bay Packers; on November 4, 2014, the Saints placed him on the injured reserve list, ending his season. He was released by the Saints on November 3, 2015 and signed to the team's practice squad on November 5, 2015. He was promoted to the active roster on December 9, 2015. He was resigned on February 10, 2016. On September 3, 2016, he was waived by the Saints. Johnson was then signed to the Saints' practice squad the next day. He was released by the team on September 13, 2016.

Tampa Bay Buccaneers
On December 14, 2016, Johnson was signed to the Tampa Bay Buccaneers' practice squad. He was promoted to the active roster on December 28, 2016. He was waived on September 2, 2017, and was signed to the Buccaneers' practice squad the next day. He was released on October 10, 2017. He was re-signed to the practice squad on December 20, 2017. He signed a reserve/future contract with the Buccaneers on January 3, 2018.

On September 1, 2018, Johnson was waived by the Buccaneers.

References

External links
New Orleans Saints bio

Living people
1989 births
American football fullbacks
American football linebackers
Tennessee Volunteers football players
Baltimore Ravens players
New Orleans Saints players
Tampa Bay Buccaneers players
Players of American football from North Carolina
People from Hickory, North Carolina